Newmarket—Aurora is a provincial electoral district in Ontario, Canada, that has been represented in the Legislative Assembly of Ontario since 2007.

The district contains the towns of Newmarket and Aurora.

The riding was created for the 2004 federal election by merging 50% of the riding of York North with 24% of the riding of Vaughan—King—Aurora.

According to the 2006 census, 121,924 people are represented in the Ontario Legislature in this riding.

The major industry in the riding is manufacturing, and auto parts maker Magna International is the largest manufacturer.  Average family income in the riding is higher than the national average at slightly over $97,000 a year.  Unemployment in the riding is lower than the national average at 3.6%.

Members of Provincial Parliament

Election results

		

	

|align="left" colspan=2|Progressive Conservative hold  
|align="right"|Swing
|align="right"|  -0.13
|

^ Change based on redistributed results

2007 electoral reform referendum

See also
 List of Canadian federal electoral districts
 Past Canadian electoral districts

References

Sources
Elections Ontario Past Election Results
Map of riding for 2018 election

Aurora, Ontario
Newmarket, Ontario
Ontario provincial electoral districts